Karl Felix Halm (also Carl; Karl Felix Ritter von Halm after 1872; 5 April 1809 – 5 October 1882), was a German classical scholar and critic.

Life
He was born at Munich.  In 1849, having held appointments at Speyer and Hadamar, he became rector of the newly founded Maximiliansgymnasium at Munich, and in 1856 director of the royal library and professor in the University of Munich. These posts he held till his death.

Works
Halm is known chiefly as the editor of Cicero and other Latin prose authors, although during his early career he also devoted considerable attention to Greek and also authored an edition of Aesop's fables in the Greek. After the death of J.C. Orelli, he joined J.G. Baiter in the preparation of a revised critical edition of the rhetorical and philosophical writings of Cicero (1854–1862). His school editions of some of the speeches of Cicero in the Haupt and Sauppe series, with notes and introductions, were very successful. He also edited a number of classical texts for the Teubner series, the most important of which are Tacitus (4th ed., 1883); Rhetores Latini minores (1863); Quintilian (1868); Sulpicius Severus (1866); Minucius Felix together with Firmicus Maternus De errore (1867); Salvianus (1877) and Victor Vitensis's Historia persecutionis Africanae provinciae (1878). He was also an enthusiastic collector of autographs.

Scholarly shorthand
Scholars of the period will sometimes talk of the "Halmian" edition, or even of the "Halmianam" edition if they are writing in Latin. By this they mean an edition authored or edited by Halm.

References
Wilhelm von Christ and Georg von Laubmann in Allgemeine deutsche Biographie
Conrad Bursian in Biographisches Jahrbuch
John Edwin Sandys, History of Classical Scholarship, iii. 195 (1908).

1809 births
1882 deaths
German classical scholars
Academic staff of the Ludwig Maximilian University of Munich
German librarians